The 17th TVyNovelas Awards is an Academy of special awards to the best soap operas and TV shows. The awards ceremony took place on March 28 1999 in Mexico D.F. The ceremony was televised in Mexico by Canal de las estrellas.

Daniela Romo and Marco Antonio Regil hosted the show. El privilegio de amar won 12 awards including Best Telenovela, the most for the evening. Other winners La mentira won 4 awards and La usurpadora, Mi pequeña traviesa, Preciosa and Soñadoras won one each.

Summary of awards and nominations

Winners and nominees

Telenovelas

Others

Special Awards 
 International Artist: Thalía
 Oongest Male Career: Gaspar Henaine "Capulina"
 Longest Female Career: Elsa Aguirre
 20-year Career: Lucero
 Child Musical Event of the Decade: Tatiana
 Best TV Production: Miguel Ángel Herros for Coverage of the Visit of the Pope John Paul II in Mexico
 Excellent Transmissions Generations Meeting with Pope: Luis de Llano Macedo and Marco Flavio Cruz
 Recognition for 10 years Continued Success: Cristina Saralegui for El Show de Cristina
 International Projection in Music: Rocío Dúrcal

Commercial Awards 
 The Best Figure: Michelle Vieth awarded for Jeans Oggi

Missing 
People who did not attend the ceremony wing and were nominated in the shortlist in each category:
 Luis de Llano Macedo
 Marga López (Her son, Carlos Amador Jr., picked it up in her place)
 Tatiana

References 

TVyNovelas Awards
TVyNovelas Awards
TVyNovelas Awards
TVyNovelas Awards ceremonies